Christian Seraphim (born 25 May 1995) is a German tennis player. Seraphim played college tennis at Wake Forest University.

Seraphim made his ATP main draw debut at the 2015 Winston-Salem Open in the doubles draw partnering Skander Mansouri.

References

External links

1995 births
Living people
German male tennis players
Wake Forest Demon Deacons men's tennis players
Tennis players from Munich